Lawrence Edward Grace "Titus" Oates (17 March 188017 March 1912) was a British army officer, and later an Antarctic explorer, who died from hypothermia during the Terra Nova Expedition when he walked from his tent into a blizzard. His death, which occurred on his 32nd birthday, is seen as an act of self-sacrifice when, aware that the gangrene and frostbite from which he was suffering was compromising his three companions' chances of survival, he chose certain death for himself in order to relieve them of the burden of caring for him.

Early life
Oates was born in Putney, Surrey, in 1880, the elder son of William Edward Oates, FRGS, and Caroline Annie, daughter of Joshua Buckton, of West Lea, Meanwood, Leeds. The Oates family were wealthy landed gentry, having had land at Dewsbury and Leeds since the 16th century; William Oates moved the family to Gestingthorpe, Essex in 1891 after becoming Lord of the manor of Over Hall at Gestingthorpe. His sister Lillian, a year older, married the Irish baritone and actor Frederick Ranalow. An uncle was the naturalist and African explorer Frank Oates.

Oates lived in Putney from 18851891. He was one of the first pupils to attend the nearby Willington School. He went on to Eton College but left after less than two years owing to ill health. He then attended an army "crammer", South Lynn School, Eastbourne. His father died of typhoid fever in Madeira in 1896.

Military career
In 1898, Oates was commissioned into the 3rd (Militia) Battalion of the West Yorkshire Regiment. He saw active service during the Second Boer War as a junior officer in the 6th (Inniskilling) Dragoons, having been transferred to that cavalry regiment as a second lieutenant in May 1900. He took part in operations in the Transvaal, the Orange River Colony, and Cape Colony. In March 1901 a gunshot wound shattered his left thigh bone, leaving it an inch shorter than the right. Twice called upon to surrender in that engagement, he replied, "We came to fight, not to surrender." He was recommended for the Victoria Cross for his actions and was brought to public attention.

He was promoted to lieutenant in 1902, and left Cape Town for England after peace was signed in South Africa. He was mentioned in despatches by Lord Kitchener in his final despatch dated 23 June 1902. He was promoted to captain in 1906, and served in Ireland, Egypt, and India. He was often referred to by the nickname "Titus Oates", after the historical figure.

Terra Nova expedition

Preparation 

In 1910, he applied to join Robert Falcon Scott's expedition to the South Pole—the Terra Nova expedition—and was accepted mainly on the strength of his experience with horses and, to a lesser extent, his ability to make a financial contribution of £1,000 towards the expedition. Nicknamed "the soldier" by his fellow expedition members, his role was to look after the 19 ponies that Scott intended to use for sledge hauling during the initial food depot-laying stage and the first half of the trip to the South Pole. Scott eventually selected him as one of the five-man party who would travel the final distance to the Pole. Belgrave Edward Sutton Ninnis, a fellow polar explorer who accompanied Douglas Mawson on the Australasian Antarctic Expedition, described Oates in his diary as "distinguished, simple-minded." Ninnis also expressed concern that Oates was the wrong man for the job.

From the beginning of the voyage, Oates was initially not a popular member onboard the Terra Nova. According to Ninnis, testimonials from crew members onboard indicated that during the voyage out "he [Oates] did not, by general affectation, increase his popularity with the fellows on board" and that "....[if] Oates gets unpopular with the other fellows, his life, cooped up with them in the hut on McMurdo Sound, will certainly not be a bed of roses." and that "....unless he pulls himself together a bit, he will find himself "returned, not wanted." Oates also clashed with Scott many times on issues of management of the expedition. "Their natures jarred on one another", expedition member Frank Debenham recalled. When he first saw the ponies that Scott had brought on the expedition, Oates was horrified at the £5 animals, which he said were too old for the job and "a wretched load of crocks." He later said: "Scott's ignorance about marching with animals is colossal." He also wrote in his diary "Myself, I dislike Scott intensely and would chuck the whole thing if it were not that we are a British expedition ... He is not straight, it is himself first, the rest nowhere ..." However, he also wrote that his harsh words were often a product of the hard conditions. Scott, less harshly, called Oates "the cheery old pessimist", adding: "the Soldier takes a gloomy view of everything, but I've come to see that this is a characteristic of him."

South Pole 

Scott, Oates and 14 other members of the expedition set off from their Cape Evans base camp for the South Pole on 1 November 1911. At various pre-determined latitude points during the  journey, the support members of the expedition were sent back by Scott in teams. On 4 January 1912, at latitude 87° 32' S, only the five-man polar party consisting of Scott, Edward Wilson, Henry Bowers, Edgar Evans and Oates remained to march the last  to the Pole.

On 18 January 1912, days after the start of their journey, they finally reached the Pole—only to discover a tent that Norwegian explorer Roald Amundsen and his four-man team had left behind at their Polheim camp, after beating them in the race to the Pole. Inside the tent was a note from Amundsen informing them that his party had reached the South Pole on 14 December 1911, beating Scott's party by 35 days.

Return 

Scott's party faced extremely difficult conditions on the return journey, mainly due to the exceptionally adverse weather, poor food supply, injuries sustained from falls, and the effects of scurvy and frostbite. On 17 February 1912, near the foot of the Beardmore Glacier, Edgar Evans died, perhaps from a blow to the head suffered in a fall days earlier.

On 15 March, Oates told his companions that he could not go on and proposed that they leave him in his sleeping bag, which they refused to do. He managed a few more miles that day but his condition worsened that night.

Death 
According to Scott's diary entry of 16 or 17 March (Scott was unsure of the date but thought the 17th correct), Oates had walked out of the tent the previous day into a  blizzard to his death. Scott wrote in his diary: "We knew that poor Oates was walking to his death, but though we tried to dissuade him, we knew it was the act of a brave man and an English gentleman." According to Scott's diary, as Oates left the tent he said, "I am just going outside and may be some time." Edward Wilson, who was also present, made no reference to this in his own diary or the letters to Oates's mother.

Scott, Wilson and Bowers continued onwards for a further  towards the One Ton food depot that could save them but were halted at latitude 79° 40' S by a fierce blizzard on 20 March. Trapped in their tent and too weak and cold to continue, they died nine days later,  short of their objective. Their frozen bodies were discovered by a search party on 12 November; Oates's body was never found. Near where he was presumed to have died, the search party erected a cairn and cross bearing the inscription: "Hereabouts died a very gallant gentleman, Captain L. E. G. Oates, of the Inniskilling Dragoons. In March 1912, returning from the Pole, he walked willingly to his death in a blizzard, to try and save his comrades, beset by hardships."

Legacy

Oates's act of self-sacrifice is one of the most memorable examples of its kind in recent history, and his understated final words are often cited as a veritable example of the traditional characteristic of British people concerning the "stiff upper lip" attitude.

Oates's reindeer-skin sleeping bag was recovered and is now displayed in the museum of the Scott Polar Research Institute in Cambridge with other items from the expedition.

The Oates Museum at Gilbert White's House, Selborne, Hampshire focuses on the lives of Lawrence Oates and his uncle Frank.

The Royal Dragoon Guards, the successor to the 6th (Inniskilling) Dragoons, have a regimental day to remember Oates. His Queen's South Africa Medal with bars and Polar Medal are held by the regimental museum in York. The then Inniskilling Dragoon Guards were reportedly given £20,000 to help purchase the medals by Sir Jack Hayward.

In 1913 his brother officers erected a brass memorial plaque to him in the parish church of St Mary the Virgin in Gestingthorpe, Essex, which his mother, Caroline, faithfully polished weekly for the rest of her life. The church is opposite his family home of Gestingthorpe Hall.

A painting of Oates walking out to his death, A Very Gallant Gentleman, by John Charles Dollman, hangs in the Cavalry Club in London. It was commissioned by officers of the Inniskilling Dragoons in 1913. It was exhibited at the Royal Academy in 1914. A preparatory sketch is in the Scott Polar Research Institute, at the University of Cambridge, having been sold by Christie's, on behalf of a private owner, for £40,000 in 2014.

In May 1914 a memorial to Oates was placed in the cloister of the newly built School Library at Eton College, itself part of the Boer War Memorial Buildings. It was executed by Kathleen Scott, the widow of the expedition's leader.

The Lawrence Oates school in Meanwood, Leeds (closed 1992), was named after him. On the 100th anniversary of his death, a blue plaque was unveiled in his honour at Meanwood Park, Leeds.

On 17 March 2007, The Putney Society unveiled a blue plaque at the site of Oates's childhood home of 263 Upper Richmond Road, Putney, London. The current address is 307 Upper Richmond Road.

In the media

 In the 1948 film Scott of the Antarctic, Oates was played by Derek Bond. The film glosses over the interpersonal difficulties in the expedition and concentrates on the heroics of the people involved.
 In The Last Place on Earth, a 1985 Central Television seven-part serial telling of both the Amundsen and Scott treks to the South Pole, the character of Oates is played by Richard Morant.
 A biography by Michael Smith, I am Just Going Outside: Captain Oates – Antarctic Tragedy, (Spellmount Publishers 2002) claimed that a 20-year-old Oates fathered a daughter after raping an 11-year-old Scots girl named Ettie McKendrick.
 Brenda Clough's 2001 science fiction novella "May Be Some Time" has Oates transported to the year 2045, where he is healed via advanced medicine. This novella formed the basis for her later novel Revise the World, which also centred on Oates.
 In Geraldine McCaughrean's 2005 book The White Darkness, a teenage girl, Symone Wates, has an obsession with Captain Titus Oates; she even creates an imaginary friend of him.
 In Frank Capra's movie Dirigible, depicting an American expedition to the South Pole in the 1930s, a fictional character played by Roscoe Karns incurs injuries similar to those of the real-life Oates, and chooses to sacrifice himself in a manner clearly inspired by the circumstances of Oates's death.
 The 1985 villanelle "Antarctica" by Derek Mahon details the last moments and sacrifice of Oates. It uses the quotation "I am just going outside and may be some time" as the basis of one of the refrains, and modulates it to "He is just going outside and may be some time".
 Terry Pratchett uses Captain Oates's last words at least three times in his Discworld Series in similar situations. These include #11, Reaper Man, in which the words "I am just going out. I may be some time" are spoken by Windle Poons; #13, Small Gods, in which the line "I'm just going out. I may be some time" is spoken by Brutha; and #16, Soul Music, in which the line "I may be some time" is spoken by Death.
 In Tom Stoppard's 1972 play Jumpers, Stoppard describes two fictional British astronauts named "Oates" and "Captain Scott" whose lunar landing craft is damaged when setting down on the moon, such that the rockets appear to have only enough lift to carry one of the astronauts off the surface. Stoppard has Scott and Oates fight to be the one to get back in the landing craft. Scott wins the fight and closes the hatch to the craft with the words "I am going up now. I may be gone for some time." 
 He is a character in Beryl Bainbridge's novel The Birthday Boys (1991) in which Bainbridge writes about the ill-fated expedition from the point of view of Scott and the four men he took to the Pole. 
 In Margaret Atwood's 2009 novel The Year of the Flood the character Adam One makes reference to "Saint Laurence 'Titus' Oates of the Scott Expedition" in a speech made to the followers of the God's Gardeners eco-fanatic religious group. One of the characters is also named after Oates.
 Spanish heavy metal band WarCry song "Capitán Lawrence" of El Sello De Los Tiempos album tells of his sacrifice to save his comrades.
 In China Miéville's SF novel Embassytown (2011), several human characters 'take the Oates Road' when they walk out in the alien city that surrounds them, where they hope to die. Oates-like brave polar explorers are also mentioned earlier in the novel when humans trade with the aliens.
 In the 1991 episode of Red Dwarf, "White Hole", and in Rob Grant's Red Dwarf novel Backwards, Kryten attempts to persuade Rimmer to make a sacrifice (specifically, turning himself, as a hologram, off so that the power-deprived ship will have more energy, allowing the remaining crew to live for an additional four months) in the manner of Captain Oates, to which Rimmer replies, "Captain Oates was a prat! If that'd been me, I'd've stayed in the tent, whacked Scott over the head with a frozen husky, and then eaten him." Before adding: "How do we know that Oates went out for this legendary walk? From the only surviving document: Scott's diary. And he's hardly likely to have written down, "February the First, bludgeoned Oates to death while he slept, then scoffed him along with the last packet of instant mash." How's that going to look when he gets rescued, eh? No, much better to say, "Oates made the supreme sacrifice", while you're dabbing up his gravy with the last piece of crusty bread."
The Lee and Herring series Fist of Fun featured a recurring sketch which portrayed Oates's sacrifice not as heroism, but as an act of passive-aggression. This behaviour would continue in other situations, such as Oates at a dinner party (in full Antarctic expedition gear) refusing the last roast potato in a way obviously designed to elicit sympathy.
 In the original version of the 1999 BBC Robbie the Reindeer holiday special Hooves of Fire, Robbie quotes Oates' last recorded words when telling Blitzen that he's leaving Santa Claus' sleigh team, similarly opting to leave on foot from the North Pole. The line is changed in CBS' American dub of the special.
 In the song "Héroes de la Antártida" by the Spanish pop group Mecano on their album Descanso Dominical.
 Australian post-rock band We Lost The Sea has a song titled "A Gallant Gentleman" off their 2015 album Departure Songs. The song pays homage to Oates's sacrifice.
 In "A Beautiful Mind", the third episode of the seventh series of Peep Show, Mark likens Jeremy's expedition to read Wuthering Heights on their balcony to Oates's death. "There goes the Captain Oates of having to read a relatively short book." Later in "The Love Bunker", Super Hans tells two people he refers to as "Hall and Oates" being sent out from a bunker back into the paintball war, "You're just going for a walk. And it may be some time." They are almost immediately heard being shot repeatedly with paintballs.
 In Monty Python’s Flying Circus, Season 2, Episode 10, Terry Jones portrays Oates in the low budget film, “Scott of the Sahara”. ( In which he saves the expedition from a giant electric penguin! )

See also
Oates Coast

Notes

References

Sources
 Smith, Michael I Am Just Going Outside. 
Scott's Last Expedition Vols I and II Smith, Elder & Co 1913 (Vol I is Scott's diary)
 Preston, Diana: A First Rate Tragedy. 
 Huntford, Roland: The Last Place on Earth. 
 Scott, Robert Falcon: Scott's Last Expedition: The Journals. 
 McCaughrean, Geraldine: The White Darkness. 
 Limb, Sue & Cordingley, Patrick: Captain Oates: Soldier and Explorer. 
 Goldsmith, Jeremy: British Army officers' records; Career Soldiers in the Family Tree Magazine (London) of June 2007, which shows Oates's Record of Service (with a birth date of 16 March 1880).

External links 

 
 
 

6th (Inniskilling) Dragoons officers
1880 births
1912 deaths
1912 suicides
Antarctic expedition deaths
British Army personnel of the Second Boer War
Collections of the Scott Polar Research Institute
Deaths from hypothermia
English explorers
Explorers of Antarctica
People educated at Eton College
People from Putney
Suicides by freezing
Terra Nova expedition
West Yorkshire Regiment officers
People from Meanwood